Moth Rangran, and Moth Karnail are two Panchayats of Moth village in Narnaund Tehsil in District Hisar of Haryana state in India. Sarpanch of Moth Rangran Is Jaswant Bhayana.

Moth village is 8 km away from Narnaund, 21 km away from Hansi City, 48 km from Hisar, 230 km from state capital Chandigarh and 150 km away from New Delhi.

The famous Bollywood and Hollywood actress Mallika Sherawat belongs to Moth Rangran Village. She was born as Reema Lamba on 24 October 1976 at Moth.

and other charming person in Moth Rangran Sunil Verma Work as a Transport Department Haryana , born as RamNiwas Verma  on 04 September 1987 at Moth Rangran.
Mithhu moth 07 is famous cricketer of moth his father name is Roshan shanshi .

Lohari, Majra, Madha, Budana, Rakhi are the nearby villages of Moth.

Villages in Hisar district